Brol is the debut studio album by Belgian singer Angèle. It was self-released on 5 October 2018 through Angèle's own label Angèle VL Records. A reissue with seven new tracks was released on 8 November 2019 under the name Brol La Suite.

The album received the Album Révélation of the Year at the 2019 Victoires de la Musique awards ceremony in France.

Artwork and title
The album cover features a photograph of Angèle as a child with her baby teeth out.

The album's title is a reference to the Belgian slang word "brol". In Brussels slang, "brol" has multiple meanings. It can refer to either a heap of random small objects, or a nondescript object of little value; a place of disorder or shambles; or a fuss.

Release and promotion
A music video for "Tout oublier" was released upon the album's release date on 5 October 2018. The video features Angèle and her brother Roméo unfittingly wearing ski attire and carrying ski equipment on the beach of a seaside resort.

Critical reception

Brol has received generally positive reviews from critics. Writing for Le Journal du Dimanche, Ludovic Perrin praised the album, calling each song excellent and perfectly arranged.

The album was included in Pretty Much Amazings list of twenty-five "Albums of the Year" for 2018.

Track listing
Credits adapted from liner notes.

Personnel
Credits adapted from liner notes.

Musicians
 Angèle Van Laeken – vocals, keyboards
 Tristan Salvati – guitar , bass , keyboards
 Veence Hanao – keyboards 
 Matthew Irons – keyboards 

Technical personnel
 Angèle – production, programming
 Tristan Salvati – mixing , production, programming, recording
 Veence Hanao – programming 
 Hugo Martinez – mixing 
 Nk.F – mixing , mastering 
 Adrien Pallot – mastering 
 Alex Gopher – mastering 
 Matthew Irons – recording , programming 
 Charlotte Abramow – photography
 Serge Van Laeken – cover photo
 Boldatwork – design

Charts

Weekly charts

Year-end charts

Certifications and sales

See also
List of best-selling albums in Belgium
List of best-selling albums in France

References

2018 debut albums
Self-released albums
French-language albums